The Aowanda Suspension Bridge is a suspension bridge in Aowanda National Forest Recreation Area, Ren'ai Township, Nantou County, Taiwan.

Technical specifications
The bridge spans over a length of 180 meters with 90 meters of clearance below it. It is equipped with 1.4 meters height of metal mesh barrier on both sides of the bridge.

Maintenance
The bridge undergoes monthly maintenance by the Forestry Bureau.

See also
 List of bridges in Taiwan

References

Buildings and structures in Nantou County
Suspension bridges in Taiwan
Tourist attractions in Nantou County